A torture murder is a murder where death was preceded by the torture of the victim. In many legal jurisdictions a murder involving "exceptional brutality or cruelty" will attract a harsher sentence if the killing is not sanctioned by authorities or carried out by state security forces themselves.

Frequency

Lynching in the United States—extrajudicial killing by a mob, which often served as a means of racial terrorism—frequently involved public torture of the victim or victims, and was in many instances followed by human trophy collecting.  Moreover, since industrial acid became available in quantity during the 19th century, acid attacks have become a globally widespread method of murder.

In the 21st century, many of the murders of foreigners in and citizens of Iraq and Syria committed by members of the terrorist organization Daesh have been preceded by torture.  Film footage of the persecution of Muslims in Myanmar documents the aftermath and testimony of torture murder by government forces, and evidence has linked torture murder with many other massacres, war crimes, and genocides, both contemporary and historical.

Punishment

Murder laws worldwide vary a great deal, but a murder involving torture will generally attract a harsher penalty than a murder alone. Legal mechanisms of penalty enhancement vary between jurisdictions. In the laws of Italy, Germany, Norway, and many parts of the United States, there are two or more "degrees" of murder, with wording such as: "...inflicting torture upon the victim prior to the victim's death" typically used to rule that the highest degree should apply. In other jurisdictions, it may be that even if there was just one crime of murder, the sentencing practices and guidelines are such that the aggravating circumstance of any torture will nevertheless allow for a harsher than normal penalty.

See also
Antisocial personality disorder
Most Evil
Psychopathy
Sadistic personality disorder
Robert Berdella
Bullying

References

Torture
Bullying
Murder
Execution methods
Killings by type